The Armed Forces Revolutionary Council (AFRC) was the government of Ghana from June 4, 1979, to September 24, 1979.

4 June military coup

The AFRC came to power in a coup that removed the Supreme Military Council, another military regime, from power. The June 4 coup was preceded by an abortive attempt on May 15, 1979, when Flt. Lt. Jerry Rawlings and other ranks were arrested. Their trial only served to make them popular till they were eventually released on the morning of June 4  by young officers and noncommissioned officers inspired by Rawlings. During the fighting that ensued throughout the day, a number of military personnel lost their lives. These include Major General Odartey-Welllington who led the government's resistance to the coup d'état. Others who fell that day included another officer, Colonel Joseph Enningful who was a former Commander of the Support Services of the Ghana Armed Forces. Other soldiers who died that day include Second-Lieutenant J. Agyemang Bio, Corporal William Tingan, Lance Corporal Sorkpor, Trooper Samuel Larsey, Trooper Emmanuel Koranteng-Apau, Lance Corporal Gabriel Follivi and Lance Corporal Mamudu Kalifa. They were all buried with full military honours at the Osu Military Cemetery in Accra.

House cleaning exercise
The regime started a 'House cleaning' exercise against corruption. Three former military leaders of Ghana, Lt. Gen. Afrifa, Gen. Acheampong and Lt. Gen. Akuffo were all executed together with five other senior officers deemed to have been corrupt by the special courts set up by the government. Numerous business entrepreneurs were also targeted and unlawfully had their assets confiscated by the AFRC government including J. K. Siaw.

The AFRC allowed already scheduled elections to go ahead and handed over to the duly elected Dr. Hilla Limann of the People's National Party who became the only president of the Third Republic of Ghana.

Membership 
The AFRC consisted of 15 members.

Captain Henry Smith – one of the architects of the uprising and  described by officers and soldiers in June 1979 as the officer who was responsible for the success of the uprising – declined membership of the AFRC. He was, nevertheless, given the portfolio of "special duties" and was also put in charge of the Foreign Affairs ministry.
Lieutenant Commander H. C. Apaloo died in a road traffic accident before the end of AFRC rule.

Commissioners 
Commissioners were in place of Ministers of state and most carried on from the previous government. A number of commissioners had to cover additional ministries during the period of the AFRC.

See also
 History of Ghana (1966–79)

References 

Conflicts in 1979
Military of Ghana
Military coups in Ghana
Governments of Ghana
Politics of Ghana
1979 establishments in Ghana
1979 disestablishments in Ghana
June 1979 events in Africa
July 1979 events in Africa
August 1979 events in Africa
September 1979 events in Africa
1970s coups d'état and coup attempts